Cipriano Rivas Cherif (1891–1967) was a Spanish playwright and director, owner of the Caracol Theatre Club and one of the pioneering directors of the Spanish theatrical avant-garde in the early twentieth century. He was among the contributors of the Madrid-based avant-garde magazine Prometeo published between 1908 and 1912. In 1934, he was offered the concession for the Teatro María Guerrero, a theatre in Madrid, by the Spanish government free-of-charge, making it possible for him to use it for his School of Art Theatre (Teatro Escuela de Arte).

References

External links
 

1891 births
1967 deaths
Spanish male dramatists and playwrights
20th-century Spanish dramatists and playwrights
20th-century Spanish male writers
Spanish Anti-Francoists